Chicago Ridge is a village in Cook County, Illinois, United States. Per the 2020 census, the population was 14,433.

History
Chicago Ridge takes its name from ridges left behind when trainloads of dirt were brought out by the Wabash Railroad during construction of the Columbian Exposition of 1893.

The path of Stony Creek arcs through the village. It is not only an old creek but also the remnants of a feeder canal for the Illinois & Michigan Canal that reached from the Little Calumet River westward through the Saganash-kee Slough. Although the work on the feeder canal brought some settlers in the 1840s, German and Dutch farmers arrived after the 1850s.

Settlement increased with the coming of the Wabash, St. Louis & Pacific Railroad in 1882. Later, the Wabash would be crossed in the middle of Chicago Ridge by the Chicago and Calumet Terminal Railway, which also established rail yards in the village.

In 1898, the Paul E. Berger Company, manufacturers of cash registers and slot machines, located adjacent to the railroad. The Berger Company built housing for its employees, and a settlement emerged around the factory, with a tavern, rooming house, and grocery store. The first post office opened in 1900 in the Berger factory, and in 1902 the Wabash Railroad established a train station.

Both Chicago Ridge and Worth benefited from the activity and economic influences of a racetrack operating on 111th Street. Local residents proudly recall that a member of one of the founding families of the Chicago Ridge area, Fred Herbert, won the Kentucky Derby in 1910. The racetrack was torn down in 1911 and is now the site of Holy Sepulchre Cemetery.

After Oak Lawn incorporated in 1909, Chicago Ridge considered the move. An incorporated government could replace wooden sidewalks, deal with the stagnant waters in the swampy areas, initiate local municipal services and provide locally elected and accountable officials. They accomplished those tasks and more. Their successors then built on those early improvements with paved streets, sewers, street lights, and sidewalks. They also brought Lake Michigan water to the area.

Chicago Ridge grew from 176 in 1920 to 888 in 1950. With the great demand for housing and the expansion of road networks to include expressways, Chicago Ridge was poised for growth. Along with a strong new industrial and commercial base, the population increased dramatically, to 5,748 in 1960 and 14,127 in 2000.

Geography
Chicago Ridge is located at  (41.702482, -87.778690).

Chicago Ridge's irregular shape is bounded by Oak Lawn on the north and east, Bridgeview and Palos Hills on the west, and Worth on the south.

Demographics
As of the 2020 census there were 14,433 people, 5,339 households, and 3,364 families residing in the village. The racial makeup of the village was 72.54% White, 9.77% African American, 0.28% Native American, 2.33% Asian, 0.01% Pacific Islander, 6.55% from other races, and 8.53% from two or more races. Hispanic or Latino of any race were 15.64% of the population.

There were 5,339 households, out of which 55.31% had children under the age of 18 living with them, 49.50% were married couples living together, 7.83% had a female householder with no husband present, and 36.99% were non-families. 33.85% of all households were made up of individuals, and 10.90% had someone living alone who was 65 years of age or older. The average household size was 3.31 and the average family size was 2.54.

The village's age distribution consisted of 22.6% under the age of 18, 5.3% from 18 to 24, 32.3% from 25 to 44, 24.5% from 45 to 64, and 15.3% who were 65 years of age or older. The median age was 35.7 years. For every 100 females, there were 103.3 males. For every 100 females age 18 and over, there were 99.5 males.

The median income for a household in the village was $51,555, and the median income for a family was $64,206. Males had a median income of $40,596 versus $33,699 for females. The per capita income for the village was $24,310. About 19.4% of families and 21.0% of the population were below the poverty line, including 32.3% of those under age 18 and 8.9% of those age 65 or over.

Note: the US Census treats Hispanic/Latino as an ethnic category. This table excludes Latinos from the racial categories and assigns them to a separate category. Hispanics/Latinos can be of any race.

Government
Chicago Ridge is in Illinois's 3rd congressional district.

Charles Polchow served as the first president of Chicago Ridge when it organized as a village in 1914. He emigrated to the United States from Germany in 1897. Charles and his wife, the former Luzina Zippel, arrived March 10, 1897, to Chicago Ridge. Their first home was a farmhouse at 107th near Oak Park Avenue, where their first four children were born. Later the family moved to another farmhouse at 105th and Central, where they had seven children. One of his sons, Herbert Polchow, became village president of Chicago Ridge in 1953. Farming was the Polchow family's first occupation, but in 1919 at 107th and South Ridgeland Avenue the family built Polchow's Grove and Tavern. Polchow's was one of three taverns, the others being John Henry Meyer's Chicago Ridge Hotel at 103rd and South Ridgeland Avenue and Liberty Hall. Charles Polchow died in 1951 at the age of 78.

Henry Schmalen was Village President from 1921 to 1924.  He moved from Chicago to Chicago Ridge after he retired from the wholesale meat business. His niece was Mary Maker, the first women trustee in Chicago Ridge.

Arthur W Meyer was Village President from 1925 to 1926.  His father was John Henry Meyer who operated the Chicago Ridge Inn and Hotel which included a tavern, next to the railroad tracks at 103rd and Ridgeland Ave.

Peter Ruices was Village President from 1927 to 1934. The Ruices family owned Rucies Tavern and Grove at 106th Street and Ridgeland Avenue which was a popular spot for special events.

Bruno Duckwitz was Village President 1937 to 1942.  He resigned his position to enlist in the armed forces in 1942 and serve active duty during World War II.  After the War, Duckwitz operated a popular Laundromat at 106th and Ridgeland until it was destroyed in a fire.

John Dokner was Village President from 1943 to 1944.  He spent 20 years in public service.  He was on the local school board and a longtime member of the towns board of auditors.  Upons this death in 1968, Worth Township issued Resolution No. 68-I honoring his service.

William Walsh was Village President from 1945 to 1952, president of the board of education, justice of the peace, and Worth Township Democratic Committeeman.

Herbert Pulchow Sr was Village President from 1953 to 1956.  He was one of 11 children to Charles (1st Village President 1914-1920) and Lucina.  He started Village wide trash collection at .25 per can.

Arthur Cooper was Village President from 1957 to 1964.   He was the first Village President born in Chicago Ridge.

Joseph Coglianese was Village President from 1965 to 1974.  The Chicago Ridge library, Public Works and Park District were formed under his administration. Firehouse 2, a Park District Building, a Police Car Garage and Elden D Finley Jr High were built during this time.   His term was cut short by legal proceedings.

In 1975 Eugene "Gene" Siegel was appointed to serve as Part-time Village President and he served as a Part-time Village President until 1993 when he was elected as a Full-time Village President, a position that he held until he retired in 2013 making him the longest serving Village President of Chicago Ridge.  His contributions to Chicago Ridge were numerous. Gene Siegel died in 2017.  The Eugene Siegel Municipal Complex at 104th and Ridgeland and Eugene and Virginia Siegel Memorial Drive on 103rd Street between Ridgeland and Southwest Highway are named after him.

William Paulus was Village President from 1955 to 1956.  Mayor Paulus was married to Marie Paulus, the town's postmaster for 1927 to 1954, and the post office was operated from their home.

The village of Chicago Ridge is governed by a President and Board of Trustees.  The Village President is the chief executive officer, and the Board of Trustees is the legislative body.  The Village Clerk is the keeper of the records.  The Village President, Board of Trustees and Clerk are all elected to four-year terms. Local elections are held every two years in the spring.

The Chicago Ridge Park District offers a "before/after" school care program.

Business and industry
Over the years, recreational and cultural amenities including parks and a library, as well as business and industry were added to the picture.

Industry
Landis Plastics, Inc. is based in Chicago Ridge, with five domestic facilities supporting North American customers. Landis manufactures injection molded and thermoformed plastic packaging for dairy and other food products. Over the past 15 years, Landis has experienced robust organic growth in sales of 10.4%. During 2002, Landis generated $211.6 million of net sales. Landis Plastics, Inc. was purchased by Berry Plastics Corp. in 2003.

The Park at Chicago Ridge is a  industrial park located off Southwest Highway at 103rd Street, which features rail transport and easy access to major expressways, including the Tri-State Tollway, and the Stevenson and Eisenhower expressways.

Notable retail businesses
The Chicago Ridge Mall (formerly Westfield Chicago Ridge) at 95th and Ridgeland has over 130 stores and a six-screen theater. The Chicago Ridge Commons at 99th and Ridgeland has over 55 strip stores. Commercial development is currently centered in the industrial sector, the Park at Chicago Ridge.

Culture

RidgeFest
Chicago Ridge hosts the annual RidgeFest celebration the last weekend in July at Freedom Park. It is one of the best-known summer festivals in the southwest suburban Chicago area. It consistently draws large crowds from throughout the Chicago metropolitan area.

Parks and recreation
The Chicago Ridge Park District has  of land available for recreational purposes, divided among nine parks containing tennis courts, baseball fields, a fitness center/gymnasium, and a newly completed miniature golf/batting cages complex. The district offers over 100 programs for residents of all ages.

Transportation
Chicago Ridge has a station on Metra's SouthWest Service, which provides daily rail service between Manhattan, Illinois, and Chicago Union Station.

Education

Public schools
Chicago Ridge provides some public services. These include the Chicago Ridge Public Library, Elden Finley Junior High School, Ridge Central Elementary School, Ridge Lawn Elementary School, Freedom Activity Center (which provides preschool), and Teen Center.

Public schooling is provided through the Chicago Ridge School District 127. Elden Finley Junior is Chicago Ridge's middle school. The mascot is a Viking. The colors are black, white, and gray. They provide grades 6 through 8.

Ridge Central Elementary School is one of Chicago Ridge's elementary schools. The mascot are stars, and the colors are navy blue and gold. They provide grades pre-kindergarten through fifth.

Ridge Lawn Elementary School is the other of Chicago Ridge's elementary schools. The mascot is an eagle. The colors are royal and white. They provide grades pre-kindergarten through fifth.

Chicago Ridge high school students attend Harold L. Richards High School in neighboring Oak Lawn.

Private schools
The Roman Catholic Archdiocese of Chicago operates Catholic schools. Our Lady of the Ridge Catholic School closed in 2018.

Notable person

 Tim Pyznarski, first baseman for the San Diego Padres
 James J. Konetski, DuPage County, Illinois, Circuit Court Judge.

References

External links
Village of Chicago Ridge official website
Chicago Ridge Park District
Chicago Ridge School District 127
Finley Junior High School

Villages in Illinois
Chicago metropolitan area
Villages in Cook County, Illinois
Populated places established in 1914
1914 establishments in Illinois